Luis Ávalos (September 2, 1946 – January 22, 2014) was a Cuban character actor. He made numerous film and television appearances, most notably in the 1971–1977 children's television show The Electric Company.

Early years
After being born in Havana, Cuba, Ávalos came to the United States with his family when he was a child. He earned a degree in theater from New York University.

Career 
Ávalos acted with the Lincoln Center Repertory Theater. His Broadway credits include Narrow Road to the Deep North (1972), The Good Woman of Setzuan (1970), Beggar on Horseback (1970), and Camino Real (1970).

In 1972, Avalos was a cast member on the PBS children’s TV show The Electric Company, most notably playing Doctor Doolots (a play on Doctor Dolittle). He joined the show in its second season and stayed until the show’s cancellation in 1977. He was good friends with fellow Electric Company star Rita Moreno. His most notable movie role was as Ramon in the 1979 comedy Hot Stuff, in which he starred alongside Jerry Reed, Dom DeLuise, and Suzanne Pleshette.

Ávalos also starred as Jesse Rodriguez on the short-lived situation comedy Condo with McLean Stevenson and as Dr. Tomas Esquivel on the short-lived situation comedy E/R with Elliott Gould and Mary McDonnell. He played Dr. Sanchez on Highcliffe Manor on NBC in 1979 and Crecencio Salos in Ned Blessing: The True Story of My Life on CBS in 1993. Additionally, he starred as Stavi in the comedy The Ringer with Johnny Knoxville.

Avalos appeared on Barney Miller.  He was in the episode "Chase" in 1977 and the episode "Bones" in 1982.

In 1989, Avalos made a guest appearance as a judge on Perry Mason: The Case of the Musical Murder.

In 2000, he founded the Americas Theatre Arts Foundation in Los Angeles to support Latin American-inspired dramatic productions.

Death 
Avalos died on January 22, 2014, of heart failure, after a heart attack. He was buried at Forest Lawn Memorial Park (Hollywood Hills) in Los Angeles at Burbank.

Filmography

References

External links
 
 
 

1946 births
2014 deaths
American sketch comedians
Cuban male film actors
Cuban male television actors
People from Havana
20th-century Cuban male actors
Burials at Forest Lawn Memorial Park (Hollywood Hills)